Istanbul Animation Festival is a festival of animated films founded in 2003 and held annually in November. Festival Director and Founder is Efe Efeoglu. The festival is organised by Alternatif Akım.

Past Years 
4th İstanbul Animation Festival

Price Winners

IAF Grand Price: John and Karen - Matthew Walker
Turkish Short: Akvaryum - Denizcan Yüzgül
Student Film: 458 nm - Jan Bitzer, Ilja Brunk, Tom Weber
First Film: Fetch - Steve Townrow
First Film: Cable - Remi Gamiette
Music Video: Last Time in Clerkeuwell - Alex Budovsky
Advertisement: Nike Fitness - Lobo
Motion Graphic: 8.1 - Deva Van Guylenborg
Jury Special prize: Don't Let It All Unravel - Sarah Cox

3rd İstanbul Animation Festival

Price Winners in Professional Branch

IAF Grand Price: Mind The Gap! - Anastasia Zhuravleva
Best 3D Animation: Stars - Eoghan Kidney
Best 2D Animation: Simone - Aksel Zeydan Göz
Best Visual Effect: Stars - Eoghan Kidney
Best Sound: Stars - Eoghan Kidney
Jury Special prizes:
Carnivore Reflux - Eddie White & James Calver
Islwyn Ogwyn - Jem Roberts

Prize Winners in Amateur Branch

IAF Grand Price: Mind The Gap! - Anastasia Zhuravleva
Best 3D Animation: Hallucii - Goo-Shun Wang
Best 2D Animation: 'Cuz - Emmanuelle Walker
Best Visual Effect: Sperm - Deniz Kader
Best Sound: Mind The Gap! - Anastasia Zhuravleva
Jury Special prizes:
Gazap - Murat Kirişçi
Mavi Kuş - Mustafa Ercan Zırh

2nd İstanbul Animation Festival

Prize Winners in Professional Branch

IAF Grand Price: Yetenikli Bay Köksal - Cenk Köksal
Best 3D Animation: Hand, Gun, Rock, WC - Aslan Elver
Best 2D Animation: Yetenikli Bay Köksal - Cenk Köksal
Best Picture: Foreverlove 2 - Nebi Yıkaroğlu
Best Visual Effect: Dalgalanan Korsan Bayrağı - Burak Özdelice
Best Sound: Dalgalanan Korsan Bayrağı, Kış Gibi - Burak Özdelice
Best Advertisement: Çelik - Anima
Jury Special prizes:
3digital - Gürkan Yılmaz
Foreverlove - Nebi Yıkaroğlu

Prize Winners in Amateur Branch

IAF Grand Price: Rasyonalite ya da Yüzyılın Yazgısı - Emir Benderlioğlu
Best 3D Animation: Caveman - Tuğhan Arslan, Dağhan Demirtaş
Best 2D Animation: Oyun Bitti - Yücel Çavdar
Best Picture: Temas - Erman Manyaslı
Best Visual Effect: Kopi - Ahmet Sönmez
Best Sound: Tangram - Şahin Özbay
Jury Special prizes:
Denizcan Yüzgül
Cem Başak

1st İstanbul Animation Festival

Prize Winners

First: Garden of Love - Onur Yeldan
Second: Ronk and Bird - Arslan Elver
Third: RobotX - Ömer Tatlısöz

References

External links
 International Animation Festival
 Alternatif Akım

Animation film festivals
Film festivals in Turkey
Recurring events established in 2003
Festivals in Istanbul
Annual events in Turkey
2003 establishments in Turkey
Autumn events in Turkey